John Brady (1812–1887) was an Irish medical doctor, landlord, and nationalist politician from County Leitrim.

Born in County Cavan, Brady was the son of Tobias and Margaret Brady.  He was a member of both the Royal College of Physicians and the Royal College of Surgeons.

He had addresses in London, Cambridgeshire and Rugby, Warwickshire.  He owned over 2,000 acres of land in County Leitrim by the 1870s, mostly within that part of the Poor Law Union of Bawnboy which was in county Leitrim, but also in Cloone, near Mohill.

In 1847, he married Sarah Rayner of Ely, Cambridgeshire. They had two daughters.

At the 1852 general election he was elected as a Tenant Right candidate to be one of the two Members of Parliament (MPs) for Leitrim.  He was re-elected at the next five general elections, serving as MP for Leitrim for 27 years until he retired in 1879 due to ill-health.

Brady died in late March 1887, at his home near Rugby.

Arms

References

External links 
 

1812 births
1887 deaths
Members of the Parliament of the United Kingdom for County Leitrim constituencies (1801–1922)
Politicians from County Cavan
Politicians from County Leitrim
People from Rugby, Warwickshire
19th-century Irish medical doctors
UK MPs 1852–1857
UK MPs 1857–1859
UK MPs 1859–1865
UK MPs 1865–1868
UK MPs 1868–1874
UK MPs 1874–1880
Irish Liberal Party MPs
Irish Parliamentary Party MPs
19th-century Irish landowners